The 1930 United States Senate election in Colorado took place on November 4, 1930. Republican Senator Lawrence C. Phipps declined to run for re-election, resulting in an open race to replace him. Edward P. Costigan, one of the founding members of the Progressive Party in Colorado and a former member of the United States Tariff Commission, won the Democratic nomination and faced attorney George H. Shaw, the Republican nominee, in the general election. Aided by the nationwide Democratic landslide, Costigan handily defeated Shaw, becoming the first Democrat elected to the Senate from Colorado since 1914.

Democratic primary

Candidates
 Edward P. Costigan, former Member of the United States Tariff Commission
 Morrison Shafroth, attorney and son of former Governor and U.S. Senator John F. Shafroth, 1924 Democratic nominee for the U.S. Senate
 James A. Marsh, former City Attorney of Denver

Results

Republican primary

Candidates
 George H. Shaw, Denver attorney
 William V. Hodges, Denver attorney

Results

General election

Results

References

1930
Colorado
United States Senate